Víctor José Davalillo Romero (born July 30, 1936) is a Venezuelan former professional baseball outfielder. He played for 30 years in the U.S., Mexico, and his homeland, compiling more than 4,100 base hits total.

Davalillo (pronounced da-va-LEE-yo) played in Major League Baseball (MLB) for the Cleveland Indians (1963–68), California Angels (1968–69), St. Louis Cardinals (1969–70), Pittsburgh Pirates (1971–73), Oakland Athletics (1973–74), and Los Angeles Dodgers (1977–80).

Davalillo, who batted and threw left-handed, was a leadoff hitter known for his speedy baserunning and capable defense. He was a fan favorite during his years with the Indians, and became a valuable utility player later in his career. He was also recognized as a superb pinch hitter. 

Davalillo also had an exceptional career in the Venezuelan Winter League, where he is the all-time leader in total base hits and career batting average. The book "Portrait of a Franchise: An Intimate Look at Cleveland Indians Baseball during the Rockin' Sixties" includes a chapter about Davalillo.

Early life
Although many baseball references show Davalillo's birthplace as Cabimas, Venezuela, in 2006 he told a biographer that he was actually born in Churuguara, Falcón. His family moved to Cabimas a few days after he was born. He grew up in the Costa Oriental region on Lake Maracaibo. His older brother, Pompeyo Davalillo, played briefly for the Washington Senators in 1953.

U.S. minor league career
Davalillo began his career as a pitcher. He was sold to the Indians organisation in 1961 and moved up the ladder to Jacksonville, their Triple-A club in the International League. Davalillo won the first batting title in the Jacksonville Suns history with a .346 batting average in 1962.

Major league career (first phase)
Davalillo became the eighth Venezuelan to play in Major League Baseball when he joined the Indians in 1963 as their leadoff hitter and center fielder. By mid-June, he was hitting for a .304 batting average and was receiving consideration for the American League Rookie of the Year Award when, he was hit by a pitch by Hank Aguirre and suffered a broken wrist. He returned from the injury to lead the Indians in hitting with a .292 along with a career-high 7 home runs in 90 games however, after the injury, he was never the same hitter against left handed pitching. In October, he was named to the  Topps All-Star Rookie Team. The following season, Davalillo finished second in the league in fielding percentage among center fielders and was named as a recipient of the  American League Gold Glove Award. He was the first left-handed throwing outfielder in major league history to win a Gold Glove Award.

In 1965, Davalillo led the league in batting at mid-season with a .345 batting average, earning him a place as the starting center fielder for the American League team in the 1965 All-Star Game. He ended the  season with a .301 batting average, third-best in the American League behind Tony Oliva and Carl Yastrzemski, the only other players to break the .300 mark that year. Davalillo had an off year in 1966, and the Indians began to use him in a platoon role, playing him when they faced right-handed pitchers. In 1967, he hit for a .302 average against right-handed pitchers but, only managed a .188 average against left handers, for a .287 average overall. 

Davalillo was batting .239 with 12 runs batted in (RBI) when he was traded from the Indians to the California Angels for Jimmie Hall before the trade deadline on June 15, 1968.<ref>[https://news.google.com/newspapers?nid=1917&dat=19680617&id=Y8JGAAAAIBAJ&sjid=eukMAAAAIBAJ&pg=781,3640855 "Major League Teams Beat Clock with Last-Minute Trading Spurt," Schenectady (NY) Gazette, Monday, June 17, 1968.] Retrieved February 17, 2023.</ref> He rebounded to lead the Angels with a .298 batting average after the trade, finishing the season with a .277 average overall, the sixth highest average in the American League.

In January , Davalillo suffered a nervous breakdown while he was in Venezuela to play in the Venezuelan Winter League. He began the 1969 season hitting for only a .155 average in 33 games and on May 30, he was traded to the St. Louis Cardinals for Jim Hicks. In his first National League at bat on June 1, 1969, Davalillo hit a three-run home run. He also made two appearances as a relief pitcher for the Cardinals in 1969 but failed to retire any batters. He is one of 14 pitchers in Major League history to have posted an infinite ERA, and the only one to have pitched in more than one game. 

Davalillo became a utility player and highly effective pinch hitter with the Cardinals in 1970. One of the previous National League record holders was also his manager in 1970: Red Schoendienst. Davalillo ended the season with a .311 average and 33 runs batted in.

The Cardinals traded Davalillo along with Nelson Briles to the Pittsburgh Pirates for Matty Alou and George Brunet in January . He continued in his role as a utility player, facing mostly right-handed pitchers and playing all three outfield positions and as a first baseman. Davalillo ended the year with a .285 batting average, helping the Pirates clinch the National League Eastern Division title. The Pirates went on to defeat the San Francisco Giants in the 1971 National League Championship Series before winning the 1971 World Series against the Baltimore Orioles. In 1972, he continued to be a valuable role player, hitting for a career-high .318 batting average in 117 games, helping the Pirates win the Eastern Division pennant, before they lost to the Cincinnati Reds in the 1972 National League Championship Series.

In July 1973, the Pirates sold Davalillo to the Oakland Athletics, who were in the midst of a pennant race with the Kansas City Royals. The Athletics eventually won the American League West Division and faced the Baltimore Orioles in the 1973 American League Championship Series. Davalillo had five hits in eight at-bats for a .625 batting average during the championship series, including a crucial RBI triple in the deciding Game 5. 

The Athletics then went on to defeat the New York Mets in the 1973 World Series. Davalillo played in six of the seven games, starting twice in center field and going 1-for-11 altogether.

After appearing in 17 games for the Athletics in the 1974 season, Davalillo was released on May 30.

Mexican League
Davalillo then played three seasons in the Mexican League. He continued to pitch on occasion.

Comeback in the majors
The Los Angeles Dodgers, seeking an experienced reserve, purchased Davalillo's contract in August 1977. As a pinch hitter and a defensive substitute, he posted a .313 batting average in 24 games for the Dodgers in 1977, helping them win the National League West Division crown.

Davalillo is remembered for his clutch pinch-hitting performance against the Philadelphia Phillies in Game 3 of the 1977 National League Championship Series. Trailing the Phillies 5–3 with 2 outs in the 9th inning, he spearheaded a three-run rally, when he surprised the Phillies by beating out a perfectly executed drag bunt. Manny Mota drove Davalillo home with a double, then scored on a single by Davey Lopes to tie the game. The Dodgers eventually won the game and went on to win Game 4 to clinch the National League championship. 

In the 1977 World Series against the New York Yankees, Davalillo made three pinch-hitting appearances, driving home one run with a single as the Dodgers lost the series in six games.

At the age of 42 in 1978, Davalillo hit for a .312 average as a pinch hitter for the Dodgers as they once again claimed the National League pennant before losing to the New York Yankees for a second consecutive year in the 1978 World Series.

Davalillo remained on manager Tommy Lasorda’s squad to start the 1979 season, but in mid-June, he returned to Triple-A ball for the first time in 17 years. He rejoined  the big club in September, going 4-for-10.

Continued action in Mexico and the majors
After the 1979 season the Dodgers released Davalillo. He returned to Mexico, and after he hit .394 in 94 games, the Dodgers reached out for him again. He played for L.A.'s Triple-A team in Albuquerque and was called up at age 44 for his last six big-league at-bats in September and October 1980.

He played in 40 final games in the Mexican League in 1981. His career south of the border continued, however, in the little-known Liga Nacional. This circuit was started in 1981 by ANABE (Asociación Nacional de Beisbolistas), a Mexican players’ association. Davalillo played in 1982 for Lechugueros de León in 1982. If Liga Nacional records still exist, they would be extremely difficult to find, but apparently Davalillo hit .360 in 124 games for the Lettuce Growers. In 1986 he was invited to join another Liga Nacional club, Tuzos de Zacatecas, but the circuit folded before he played for the Gophers.

Winter League career
Davalillo kept playing in the Venezuelan Winter League until the age of 50. All told, he played in 30 seasons between 1957 and 1987:

 19 for the Leones del Caracas (1957-58 through 1974–75, 1986-87)
 One for "Tibuleones" de Portuguesa (1975-76)
 10 for the Tigres de Aragua (1976–77 through 1985-86). 

Davalillo retired after appearing in the 1987 Caribbean Series.

Other leagues in Venezuela

 1959-60: Liga Occidental Zuliana (postseason reinforcement
 1983: Liga Centro Occidental
 1985-86: Liga de Verano (as player-manager)
 1985: Liga Instruccional "Angel Millán"

Career statistics
In a 16-year major-league career, Davalillo played in 1,458 games, accumulating 1,122 hits in 4,017 at bats for a .279 career batting average along with 36 home runs, 329 runs batted in, a .315 on-base percentage, 509 runs, 160 doubles, 37 triples, and 125 stolen bases. He finished his career at center field with a .988 fielding percentage, ranking him 61st among major league center fielders since .

In the Venezuelan Winter League, he set lifetime league records that still stand in batting average (.325), hits (1,505), games played (1,280), at-bats (4,633), runs (668), doubles (196), runs batted in (483) and career seasons (30). Beside this, he won four batting titles and set record in hits (100) in a season.

The 2019 biography Vitico al Bate credits him with 4,158 total base hits as a professional: 

 Along with 1,505 regular-season hits in the Venezuelan winter league, 131 in that league's postseason and 21 more in All-Star games
 Along with 1,122 in the major leagues, 10 more in MLB postseason play and one in the All-Star Game
 Along with 379 in the U.S. minors, three in a minor-league All-Star game
 829 in Mexico
 130 in other Venezuelan leagues
 27 in the Caribbean Series and Inter-American Series

This total may not account for U.S. minor-league postseason games.
Note also that La Enciclopedia del Beisbol Mexicano'' credits Davalillo with 782 in the Mexican League. Uncertainty exists around totals in the Liga Nacional.

Honors
In 1987, the ballpark in Cabimas, Zulia, was renamed Estadio Víctor Davalillo. The Most Valuable Player award in the Venezuelan Professional Baseball League is also named after him.

In 2003, Davalillo was selected to the inaugural class of the Venezuelan Baseball Hall of Fame and Museum.

The Venezuelan winter league played its 2019-20 season in Davalillo's honor.

In March 2022, a youth baseball program in Caracas called "Escuela de Beisbol Menor Víctor Davalillo" began operations.

See also
 List of players from Venezuela in Major League Baseball
 List of Gold Glove Award winners at outfield

References

External links

Vic Davalillo at SABR (Baseball BioProject)
Vic Davalillo at Baseball Library
Vic Davalillo at Pura Pelota (Venezuelan Professional Baseball League)
Vic Davalillo in Baseball Digest article December 1963
Vic Davalillo in Baseball Digest article May 1964
Vic Davalillo in Baseball Digest article September 1965
Vic Davalillo in Safe By A Mile by Charlie Metro and Thomas L. Altherr
Brobdingnagian In Lilliput, by Jack Tobin, Sports Illustrated, August 28, 1972

1939 births
Living people
Albuquerque Dukes players
American League All-Stars
Angeles de Puebla players
Cafeteros de Córdoba players
California Angels players
Cleveland Indians players
Columbia Reds players
Gold Glove Award winners
Havana Sugar Kings players
Jacksonville Suns players
Jersey City Jerseys players
Leones del Caracas players
Llaneros de Portuguesa players
Los Angeles Dodgers players
Major League Baseball center fielders
Major League Baseball players from Venezuela
Oakland Athletics players
Palatka Redlegs players
People from Cabimas
People from Falcón
Pittsburgh Pirates players
Rieleros de Aguascalientes players
St. Louis Cardinals players
Tigres de Aragua players
Topeka Reds players
Visalia Redlegs players
Venezuelan expatriate baseball players in Mexico
Venezuelan expatriate baseball players in the United States
Venezuelan expatriate baseball players in Cuba